D. magnum  may refer to:
 Dacrydium magnum, a conifer species found in Indonesia and Papua New Guinea
 Dendrochilum magnum, an orchid species

See also
 Magnum (disambiguation)